Sauteurs (pronounced Sau-tez) is a fishing town in the Saint Patrick Parish, Grenada and is the fourth-largest city on the island of Grenada, with a population of about 1,300. It is located in the far north of Grenada. Sauteurs is overlooking over the Sauteurs Bay. It is the largest town in the northern part of Grenada, and it is the capital city of the Saint Patrick Parish.

History

Here, the last remaining Carib Natives in Grenada jumped off a 40-meter-tall cliff later named Caribs' Leap to their deaths in 1651 rather than face domination by the conquering French. Thus the town was named Sauteurs, which is French for "jumpers". In 1721, the French established St Patrick's Catholic church, which in 1784 the British government handed over to the Anglicans. However, the church was destroyed by fire. A police station now occupies the site.

On 1 March 1796, the armed transport Sally, and two commandeered sloops evacuated some 11 to 2100 British troops and militia who were trapped at Sauteurs by insurgents during Julien Fédon's revolt.

In 1840 a new St Patrick Catholic church was constructed and remains to this day.

Education
In 2012 there were six Government/Assisted schools located in the Sauteurs area. Education is free and compulsory up to the age of 16. There are also several tertiary institutions in Sauteurs, like St. Patrick's Multi-Purpose Training, part of the T.A. Marryshow Community College (TAMCC).

Images

References

Populated places in Grenada
History of British Grenada